The veiled anglemouth, Cyclothone microdon, is a bristlemouth of the family Gonostomatidae, abundant in all the world's oceans at depths of 300 – 2,500 meters (980-8,200 feet). Its length is 10–15 cm (4–8 in) though the largest known specimen is 7.6 cm (3 in). It gets its name from its circular mouth, filled with small teeth: the name “cyclothone” means in a circle or around and “microdon” means small teeth.  The International Union for Conservation of Nature (IUCN) has assessed the veiled anglemouth is of Least Concern due to its abundance in most oceans and the little effect human impact has on its population growth. 
	Some of the veiled anglemouth's physical features include a brown to black body with a radiating, or expansive, bioluminescent pigment over its head and fins.

Distribution and Habitat
	The veiled anglemouth is found to be more abundant at higher latitudes, typically 50-60° North. The range of the veiled anglemouth includes anywhere from the Atlantic, Mediterranean and Pacific oceans and even extends to the Black Sea. It is a deep-sea fish found at a maximum depth of 5,300 m, though it typically spends its time in depths of 3,000 - 4,000 m. It is still unknown whether the veiled anglemouth migrates, studies have shown that migration, if present, will not significantly affect population densities.

Population
	Veiled anglemouth catches are typically composed of adult females, implying that younger anglemouths mature elsewhere or that the fish breeds seasonally in such a way that all the younger fish grew into adulthood by the time catches took place.  Studies have shown, however, that breeding is not done on an entirely seasonal basis, which puts the temporal displacement of younger individuals into question. Due to few environmental factors, the veiled anglemouth's population trends are very stable. In fact, some estimates place c. microdon as one of the most abundant fish in the deep Atlantic accounting up to 80% of the fish individuals. 
	The high prevalence of females during veiled anglemouth catches is likely due to the animal's ability to change sex. It is believed sex reversal typically occurs when the fish reaches 22 – 24 mm (0.86 – 0.94 in) in length.

Human Uses
The veiled anglemouth has no direct use for human consumption. However, it is believed to be a source of food for many commercial fish.

Physical Characteristics
The veiled anglemouth is sometimes referred to as the small-eyed lanternfish because of its ability to bioluminesce, typically near its belly and around the eyes. The veiled anglemouths also possess the ability to change their sex. As noted above, most catches are typically female. Studies have shown that female density of veiled anglemouth populations are the determining factor whether males will make the switch into a female once they reach a certain length.  This sex exchange is irreversible, so once a male becomes female it can never return to being male.

Diet
	The veiled anglemouth is believed to feed on copepods and other tiny crustaceans that are available to it. Another known prey item of veiled anglemouths are ostracods.

References

Sources
 
 Tony Ayling & Geoffrey Cox, Collins Guide to the Sea Fishes of New Zealand,  (William Collins Publishers Ltd, Auckland, New Zealand 1982) 
 
 http://www.arctic.uoguelph.ca/cpl/organisms/fish/marine/bristlemouths/veiled.htm
 https://www.cambridge.org/core/journals/journal-of-the-marine-biological-association-of-the-united-kingdom/article/distribution-and-diet-of-cyclothone-microdon-gonostomatidae-in-a-submarine-canyon/8D18D4624EDC95BB5A22D7C42C7201D5

Gonostomatidae
Deep sea fish
Fish described in 1878
Taxa named by Albert Günther